Siegl may refer to:

Antonín Siegl (born 1880), Czech sports shooter
Dietrich Siegl (born 1954), Austrian actor
Franz Siegl (born 1955), Austrian bobsledder
Hans Siegl (1944–1978), international speedway rider
Harald Siegl (born 1972), Austrian equestrian
Horst Siegl (born 1969), Czech professional footballer
Lea Siegl (born 1998), Austrian equestrian
Patrik Siegl (born 1976), Czech football player
Philipp Siegl (born 1993), Austrian football player
Siegrun Siegl (born 1954), East German athlete
Zev Siegl (born 1942), American keynote speaker and presenter

German-language surnames